Anthony Calvano (born January 8, 1982) is an American soccer player.

Career

College
Calvano was cut by the varsity soccer team at Pennsylvania State University his freshman year, he played for the Pennsylvania State University men's club soccer team that season, helping guide the Penn State club team to an undefeated record of 25-0-5 and winning the 2000 NIRSA (National Intramural and Recreational Sports) National Soccer Championship with a 2–0 victory over Texas Tech.  Calvano was cut again his sophomore year, he again played for the Penn State men's club team, the team's unbeaten streak reached 54 matches before falling to BYU 4–1 in the semifinals of the 2001 NIRSA National Soccer Championship.  Calvano finally made the varsity college soccer team at Pennsylvania State University in 2002, his junior year, he appeared in 20 of 24 matches that season, starting 9 of them, and helped the team win the Big Ten tournament for the first time since 1993.  Over the next two years Calvano played as a defender and started in all 42 games for Penn State during his final two years of NCAA eligibility, registering 2 goals and 4 assists, this after not playing a single minute on the varsity team as a freshman or sophomore.

Professional
Calvano turned professional when he signed with Pittsburgh Riverhounds of the USL Second Division in 2005 and made his professional debut on April 23, 2005, in Pittsburgh's 1–0 opening day defeat to the Harrisburg City Islanders.

He transferred to the Harrisburg City Islanders in 2007, and played every single minute of Harrisburg's 2007 championship season. On February 2, 2010, Harrisburg City announced the re-signing of Calvano for the 2010 season.

References

External links
Harrisburg City Islanders bio

1982 births
Living people
American soccer players
Penn State Nittany Lions men's soccer players
Penn FC players
Pittsburgh Riverhounds SC players
USL Second Division players
Soccer players from California
Association football defenders